Frances Jones Mills (July 4, 1920 – May 24, 1996) was an American politician who was a state official in Kentucky for a large portion of the 1970s and 1980s. She was the first woman and first Democrat in the 20th century to win the office of State Representative for the Knox County, Kentucky district. She was also the first woman to serve three (non-successive) terms as Kentucky State Treasurer, serving a total of 12 years.

Background
Mills was born in Gray, a small town in Knox County, Kentucky to Dr. William H. Jones and Bertie (Steely) Jones. She graduated from Cumberland College in Williamsburg, Kentucky and attended Eastern Kentucky State Teacher's College. She taught school in Gray for eight years after which she married Marvin Wayne Bowling, whom she later divorced in the early 1940s. She then married Gene Mills in 1949.

Public office
Mills was elected to the Kentucky House of Representatives from Knox County, Kentucky in 1961 as a Democrat, serving one term from a heavily Republican district. She then worked as an aide to the Speaker of the House.

Mills was an unsuccessful candidate for the U.S. House of Representatives in 1964, winning the Democratic nomination but losing the general election to Republican Tim Lee Carter despite the nationwide Democratic landslide as Lyndon B. Johnson retained the presidency by a huge margin over Barry Goldwater.

From 1965 to 1972 she worked for the Kentucky Civil Defense, but in 1971 Mills was nominated for Clerk of the Kentucky Court of Appeals. She won that election earning her first statewide office. Mills later sought and won election to the office of State Treasurer in 1975, 1983, and 1991. She was also elected Secretary of State in 1979. Mills unsuccessfully sought the office of Secretary of State of Kentucky in 1987, losing to Bremer Ehrler, and 1995, losing to John Y. Brown III.

For 100 years (1891–1992) the Kentucky Constitution did not allow any holder of statewide office to succeed themselves for a second consecutive term. As a result, a handful of Kentucky politicians became known as musical chairs officeholders because they would run for one statewide office and then another repeatedly. Thelma Stovall, Drexell R. Davis and Mills were the best known musical chairs officeholders in Kentucky. The three often traded offices in given election years through the 1970s and 1980s.

In 1984, Mills and six of her employees in the secretary of state's office were indicted for violating state ethics laws in regards to her election as State Treasurer. Mills was acquitted after a two-year-long case. In the early 1990s she was charged with violating ethics laws and was fined $11,000. She filed an appeal and the case was still pending at the time of her death.

Death
On May 24, 1996, Mills died of cancer and is buried in the Highland Cemetery in Williamsburg, Kentucky.

See also
 John Y. Brown, Jr.
 Martha Layne Collins
 Drexell R. Davis
 Thelma Stovall

References

Further reading

External links
 

|-

State treasurers of Kentucky
1920 births
1996 deaths
Secretaries of State of Kentucky
Democratic Party members of the Kentucky House of Representatives
Women state legislators in Kentucky
University of the Cumberlands alumni
Eastern Kentucky University alumni
20th-century American politicians
20th-century American women politicians